The 1990–92 FIRA Trophy was the 29th edition of a European rugby union championship for national teams. The format returned to a two-year tournament.

The tournament was won by France, with a Grand Slam. Italy, improving their competitive performance, finished in 2nd place, while Romania where 3rd. Both teams qualified for the 1991 Rugby World Cup, since the first two games also were valid for the qualification, while Soviet Union missed them. This would be their last presence at the FIRA Trophy, since the country ceased to exist on 25 December 1991. They were replaced by the CIS for the final two games. Spain failed the 1991 Rugby World Cup qualification because of her two losses in the opening games, had a narrow defeat to Italy (22-21), and a win over Romania (6-0), both at home, but wasn't able to avoid the 5th and last place, and were relegated.

The winners of the Second Division pools were Germany and Morocco. 



First division 

Due to Dissolution of the Soviet Union, the Soviet Union was replaced by the Commonwealth of Independent States.

Second division

Pool A

Pool B

Third division

Pool 1 
(not completed due to the withdrawal of Yugoslavia)

Pool 2
 Semifinals

Third place final

 Final

References

Bibliography 
 Francesco Volpe, Valerio Vecchiarelli (2000), 2000 Italia in Meta, Storia della nazionale italiana di rugby dagli albori al Sei Nazioni, GS Editore (2000) .
 Francesco Volpe, Paolo Pacitti (Author), Rugby 2000, GTE Gruppo Editorale (1999).

External links
1990-92 FIRA Trophy at ESPN

1990-92
1990–91 in European rugby union
1991–92 in European rugby union
1992 rugby union tournaments for national teams
1991 rugby union tournaments for national teams
1990 rugby union tournaments for national teams